Alexander Michelis (25 December 1823, in Münster – 23 January 1868, in Weimar) was a German landscape painter.

Biography 
His father, Franz Michelis (1762–1835), was a draftsman and engraver. From 1843 to 1851, he studied at the Kunstakademie Düsseldorf under the tutelage of Johann Wilhelm Schirmer. While there, he became a member of the Malkasten painters' association and succeeded Hermann Heinrich Becker as its Secretary

He spent ten years in Düsseldorf as a free-lance artist, but also gave private art lessons; notably to Princess Marie of Hohenzollern-Sigmaringen and Infanta Antónia of Portugal. In 1863, he was appointed a Professor at the Grand-Ducal Saxon Art School, Weimar, where he took the position originally held by Arnold Böcklin. He remained there until his death.

His older brother, Friedrich, was a well-known philosopher and theologian.

References

Further reading 

 
Exhibition catalog: Hinaus in die Natur!: Barbizon, die Weimarer Malerschule und der Aufbruch zum Impressionismus, Gerda Wendermann (ed.) Verlag Kerber Art, 2010,
 Exhibition catalog: Die Weimarer Malerschule: Zum Gedächtnis der Gründung der Weimarer Kunstschule im Jahre 1860. Weimarer Kunstsammlungen, 1960

External links 

1823 births
1868 deaths
19th-century German painters
19th-century German male artists
German landscape painters
People from Münster